Three vessels of the Royal Navy, two actual and one whose construction was cancelled, have been named HMS Robust:

  was a 74-gun third-rate ship of the line of the Royal Navy, launched in 1764 at Harwich.
  – construction was suspended in 1861, and cancelled in 1872.
  – a fleet tug

Royal Navy ship names